Amira, Ameerah, or Ameera may refer to:

Arts and entertainment
 Amira (album), by Amira Willighagen, 2014
 Amira (film), a 2021 Jordanian film

People
 Amira (name), an Arabic and Hebrew female given name
 Amira (singer), American singer
 Ameerah (singer) or Ameerah El Ouiglani, Belgian Tunisian singer

Other
 Amira (software), a data analysis and visualization software
 , a U.S. Navy patrol vessel in commission 1917–1919
 Amira language or Jebel el Amira, a Niger–Congo language spoken in Kordofan, Sudan
 Amira Nature Foods, an Indian food company
 Amira (wasp), a wasp genus in the subfamily Encyrtinae
 Amira (Ottoman Empire), an elite Ottoman Armenian business class
Amira (female name)

See also 
 Amir (name)
 Procapperia amira, a moth of the family Pterophoridae